Nikita Alekseevich Avtaneev (born 3 September 1995) is a Russian snowboarder.

Career
He competed at the 2014 Winter Olympics in Sochi.

References

1995 births
Living people
Sportspeople from Moscow
Russian male snowboarders
Olympic snowboarders of Russia
Snowboarders at the 2012 Winter Youth Olympics
Snowboarders at the 2014 Winter Olympics
Snowboarders at the 2018 Winter Olympics
Universiade gold medalists for Russia
Universiade medalists in snowboarding
Competitors at the 2019 Winter Universiade
Competitors at the 2015 Winter Universiade
20th-century Russian people
21st-century Russian people